The list of ship launches in 1833 includes a chronological list of some ships launched in 1833.


References

Sources

1833
Ship launches